William Salmon (1644–1713) is English writer on medical topics.

William Salmon may also refer to:
William Salmon (politician) (1802–1868), lawyer, judge and politician in Upper Canada
William Salmon (cricketer) (1846–1907), New Zealand businessman and cricketer
William Charles Salmon (1868–1925), American politician
William Salmon (painter) (1928–2018), Australian painter

See also
Bill Sammon, American journalist
William Salmond (disambiguation)